HMS Hyacinth was an 18-gun Royal Navy ship sloop. She was launched in 1829 and surveyed the north-eastern coast of Australia under Francis Price Blackwood during the mid-1830s.  She took part in the First Opium War, destroying, with HMS Volage, 29 Chinese junks. She became a coal hulk at Portland in 1860 and was broken up in 1871.

Design and construction
Hyacinth was the second of four s, which were a ship-rigged and lengthened version of the 1796 . All four ships of the class were ordered on 10 June 1823 and Hyacinth was laid down at Plymouth Dockyard in March 1826. She was launched on 6 May 1829 and commissioned for the West Indies Station on 12 January 1830.

Dimensions
She was flush-decked with a small forecastle and quarterdeck.

Armament
She was armed with sixteen 32-pounder carronades and two 9-pounder bow chaser guns.

Service

During her 42-year career, she was stationed in the West and East Indies from 1829–41, took part in the First Opium War from 1841–42, and from 1843-46 was stationed off the west coast of Africa in the suppression of the slave trade. After being reduced to 14 guns in 1848, she later became a coal hulk at Portsmouth. On 2 October 1871, Hyacinth drove ashore and sank in the Clarence Creek. She was subsequently broken up.

Notes

References

External links
 
 Career of HMS Hyacinth at William Loney website
 

 

Sloops of the Royal Navy
Ships of the West Africa Squadron
Ships built in Plymouth, Devon
Coal hulks
1829 ships
First Opium War ships of the United Kingdom
Survey vessels of the Royal Navy
Exploration of Australia
Maritime exploration of Australia
Maritime incidents in October 1871